Aoife McArdle is an Irish director, writer, and cinematographer working in film and television.

Early life 

Aoife McArdle grew up in Omagh, Northern Ireland.

She studied English Literature at Trinity College, Dublin where, alongside creative writing, she developed an interest in photography and cinematography, shooting and editing films on Super 8 and Mini DV. She went on to complete a Masters in Film & TV production at Bournemouth film school. She began her film and music video career upon moving to London in 2005.

Career 
In 2022, she was a director and producer on the television series Severance which aired on Apple TV to universal acclaim. The show starred Adam Scott, Patricia Arquette, Christopher Walken and John Turturro. 

In 2021, she directed the short film and immersive installation All of This Unreal Time featuring Cillian Murphy performing a monologue written by Max Porter with music composed by Jon Hopkins, Aaron Dessner and Bryce Dessner. The piece launched at Manchester International Festival.  

Her debut feature-length film, Kissing Candice, premiered at the Toronto International Film Festival in September 2017 and at Berlin International Film Festival in February 2018 to critical acclaim.  

In 2015, she was approached by Jefferson Hack from Dazed magazine to write and direct a short film to accompany U2's track Every Breaking Wave. The film received praise from Spike Jonze and Alejandro Gonzalez Inarritu and was nominated for four UK Music Video awards.    

She has created music videos for Jon Hopkins and Bryan Ferry, television commercials for Honda,  and Nike and Super Bowl commercials for Audi, Toyota and Squarespace. Her work in advertising has promoted social equality.   

Her short-form work has won awards including a UK Music Video Award, D&AD Pencils, Lions at Cannes Lions International Festival of Creativity and Gold British Arrows.

Artistic style 

Her narratives often centre around outsider characters and existential themes, moving between the authentic and the surreal.

McArdle's visual style is characterised by distinctive locations, long, choreographed tracking and crane shots and low-key lighting. She favours anamorphic lenses and shooting on 35mm film.

Filmography

Feature films 

 Kissing Candice - Irish Film Board - 2018

Television 
 Severance - Apple - 2022
 Brave New World - Peacock - 2020

Short films 

 All of this Unreal Time - Manchester International Festival - 2021
 Italy, Texas - Vice/55DSL - 2013
 Beyond the Fervent Heat - Design Forum - 2013

Music videos  

 Water (ft Clara La San) - Bicep - 2022
 Trouble in Town - Coldplay - 2020
 Every Breaking Wave - U2 - 2015
 Loop De Li - Bryan Ferry - 2014
 Half-Light - Wilkinson - 2014
 Open Eye Signal - Jon Hopkins - 2013
 Red Dust - James Vincent McMorrow - 2013
 Glacier - James Vincent McMorrow - 2013
 Cavalier - James Vincent McMorrow - 2013
 Lesson Number Seven - Clock Opera - 2012
 Seraphim - Simian Mobile Disco - 2012
 Desire - Anna Calvi - 2011
 Isles - Little Comets - 2011
 K Hole - Ali Love - 2006
 Martell - The Cribs - 2005
 What's your Damage - Test Icicles - 2005
 Circle, square, triangle - Test Icicles - 2005
 Helicopter (US) - Bloc Party - 2005
 Pioneers - Bloc Party - 2005

Commercials 

 The Singularity - Squarespace - 2023 (Superbowl LVII)
 Live the Game - Playstation - 2019
 Dream with Us - Nike - 2019
 Good Odds - Toyota - 2018 (Superbowl LII) 
 Runner - Toyota - 2018
First Breath - Alzheimer's Research UK - 2018
 Equal Love - Absolut - 2017
 Daughter - Audi - 2017 (Superbowl LI)
 Prince with 1000 Enemies - Under Armour - 2016
 Numbers - Under Armour - 2016
Raise - Secret - 2016
 Ignition - Honda - 2015
 Feel More - Samsung - 2015
 This is Major - Electric Ireland - 2014
Wheels on the Car - Safer Scotland - 2013
L'Homme Idéal - GQ Magazine - 2008

Awards & Nominations 
 2023 Nominated for Outstanding Directorial Achievement by DGA for 'Severance'
 2022 Primetime Emmy Nominated for Outstanding Drama Series for 'Severance'
 2022 Nominated for Best Directing in a Streaming Series, Drama by the Hollywood Critics Association for 'Severance'
 2022 Nominated for Best Narrative Short at Tribeca Film Festival for 'All of This Unreal Time'
 2020 In Book for Direction at D&AD Awards for 'Trouble in Town', Coldplay
2018 Winner of Bronze Lion at Cannes for 'Good Odds', Toyota
2018 Winner of Silver for Direction at Clio Awards for 'Good Odds' Toyota
2018 Nominated for Crystal Bear, Best Film in Generation 14plus at the Berlin International Film Festival for Kissing Candice
 2018 Winner of Graphite Pencil for Direction at D&AD Awards for 'Equal Love', Absolut
2018 Winner of Yellow Pencil for Cinematography at D&AD Awards for 'Equal Love', Absolut
2018 Winner of two Golds, a Silver and a Bronze at British Arrow awards for 'Equal Love', Absolut
2018 Nominated for the Glass Lion at Cannes for 'Daughter', Audi
2017 Nominated for the Discovery award at Toronto International Film Festival for Kissing Candice 
 2015 Nominated for Best Music Video at Camerimage for 'Every Breaking Wave' U2
 2015 Nominated for Best Music Video at UK Music Video Awards for 'Every Breaking Wave' U2
 2014 Nominated for Best Director at UK Music Video Awards
 2014 Nominated for Best Music Video at Camerimage 'Red Dust' James Vincent McMorrow
 2014 In Book for Cinematography at D&AD Awards for 'Open Eye Signal', Jon Hopkins
 2013 Nominated for Best International Short Film at Raindance for 'Italy, Texas: Wild Souls in the hot, blind, earth' 
 2013 Winner of Best Cinematography at UK Music Video Awards for 'Open Eye Signal', Jon Hopkins
 2011 Winner of Best Music Video at Rushes Soho Shorts for 'Isles', Little Comets
 2009 Winner of Best Commercial at Art Director's Club Paris for 'L'homme Ideal', GQ Magazine
 2008 Winner of Bronze Lion at Cannes for 'L'homme Ideal', GQ Magazine

References

External links 
 Aoife Mcardle on IMDB
 https://vimeo.com/aoifemcardle on Vimeo

Year of birth missing (living people)
Living people
21st-century Irish people
People from County Tyrone
Irish music video directors
Irish television directors
Alumni of Trinity College Dublin
Alumni of Bournemouth University